Sylwia Matysik (born 20 May 1997) is a Polish footballer who plays as a midfielder in the German Frauen Bundesliga and plays for Bayer Leverkusen and has appeared for the Poland women's national team.

Career
Matysik has been capped for the Poland national team, appearing for the team during the 2019 FIFA Women's World Cup qualifying cycle.

References

External links
 
 
 

1997 births
Living people
Polish women's footballers
Poland women's international footballers
Women's association football midfielders
Medyk Konin players
Górnik Łęczna (women) players
Bayer 04 Leverkusen (women) players
Expatriate women's footballers in Germany
Polish expatriate sportspeople in Germany